Chorisops nagatomii, the bright four-spined legionnaire, is a European species of soldier fly.

Distribution
England, Austria, Switzerland, E. Europe.

References

Stratiomyidae
Diptera of Europe
Insects described in 1979